Phnom Srok   is a town and seat of Phnom Srok District in Banteay Meanchey Province in north-western Cambodia. It is located 52 kilometres north-east of Sisophon.

Towns in Cambodia
Phnom Srok District
Populated places in Banteay Meanchey province